The majority of the population of Iran (approximately 67–80%) consists of Iranic peoples. The largest groups in this category include Persians (who form the majority of the Iranian population) and Kurds, with smaller communities including Gilakis, Mazandaranis, Lurs, Tats, Talysh, and Baloch.

Turkic peoples constitute a substantial minority of about 7–24%, the largest group being the Azerbaijani.They are the second largest ethnicity in Iran as well as the largest minority group. Other Turkic groups include the Turkmen and Qashqai peoples.

Arabs account for about 2–3% of the Iranian population.  The remainder, amounting to about 1% of Iranian population, consists of a variety of minor groups, mainly comprising Assyrians, Armenians, Georgians, Circassians, and Mandaeans.

At the beginning of the 20th century, Iran had a total population of just below 10 million, with an approximate ethnic composition of: 6 million Persians (60%), 2.5 million Azeris (25%), 0.2 million Mazandaranis and Gilakis each (2% each).

Iranic peoples

Persians

A CIA World Factbook estimate from 2007 put Persians at 51% of the population of the country. Another source, the United States Library of Congress states Iran's Persians compose 65% of the country's population. However, other sources mention that Persians only comprise 50.5%, or 55.3%. Some of these numbers include the Mazandaranis and Gilakis as Persian people, though the CIA World Factbook makes a distinction between the Persian language and the Mazandarani and Gilaki language, respectively.

Kurds

Kurds are an Iranian people, who make up the majority of the population of Kurdistan, Ilam, Kermanshah provinces and together with the Azeris, they are one of the two main ethnic groups in West Azerbaijan province. The northern part of Lorestan province is inhabited by Kurdish Lak people. Kurdish people also make up the plurality of the North Khorasan province and a minority in Razavi Khorasan and are scattered throughout many other provinces of Iran.

Lurs

Lur people speak the Luri language and inhabit parts of west – south western Iran. Most Lur are Shi’a. They are the fourth largest ethnic group in Iran after the Persians, Azeri, and Kurds. They occupy Lorestan, Chaharmahal and Bakhtiari, Khuzestan, Isfahan, Fars, Bushehr and Kuh-Gilu-Boir Ahmed provinces. The authority of tribal elders remains a strong influence among the nomadic population. It is not as dominant among the settled urban population.  As is true in Bakhtiari and Kurdish societies, Lur women have much greater freedom than women in other groups within the region. The Luri language is Indo-European. The Lur people may be related to the Kurds from whom they "apparently began to be distinguished from... 1,000 years ago." The Sharafnama of Sharaf Khan Bidlisi "mentioned two Lur dynasties among the five Kurdish dynasties that had in the past enjoyed royalty or the highest form of sovereignty or independence." In the Mu'jam Al-Buldan of Yaqut al-Hamawi mention is made of the Lurs as a Kurdish tribe living in the mountains between Khuzestan and Isfahan. The term Kurd according to Richard Frye was used for all Iranian nomads (including the population of Luristan as well as tribes in Kuhistan and Baluchis in Kerman) for all nomads, whether they were linguistically connected to the Kurds or not.

Mazandaranis 

The Mazanderani people or Tabari people are an Iranian people whose homeland is the North of Iran (Tabaristan). Like the closely related Gilaks, the Mazanderanis are a Caspian people who inhabit the south coast of the Caspian Sea, part of the historical region that used to be called Tabaristan and are currently one of the main ethnic groups residing in the northern parts of Iran. They speak the Mazandarani language, a language native to around 4 million people, but all of them can speak Persian. The Alborz mountains mark the southern boundary of Mazanderani settlement. The Mazanderani peoples number differs between three million and four million (2006 estimate) and many of them are farmers and fishermen.

Gilaks

The Gilaki people or Gilaks are an Iranian people native to the northern Iran province of Gilan and are one of the main ethnic groups residing in the northern part of Iran. Gilaks, along with the closely related Mazandarani people, comprise part of the Caspian people, who inhabit the southern and southwestern coastal regions of the Caspian Sea. They speak the Gilaki language and their population is estimated to be between 3 to 4 million (4% of the population). Gilaki people live both alongside the Alborz mountains, and in the surrounding plains. Consequentially, those living along the northern side of the Alborz mountains tend to raise livestock, while those living in the plains farm. Gilaks play an important role in provincial and national economy, supplying a large portion of the region's agricultural staples, such as rice, grains, tobacco and tea. Other major industries include fishing and caviar exports, and the production of silk.

Talysh

The Talysh are an Iranian people. The Talysh of Iran are about 430,000 and live mostly in the province of Gilan in north of Iran. They are indigenous to a region shared between Republic of Azerbaijan and Iran which spans the South Caucasus and the southwestern shore of the Caspian Sea. Another significant amount of Talysh live therefore also in the Republic of Azerbaijan.

Tats

The Tats are an Iranian people. The Tats of Iran are centralised near the Alborz Mountains, especially in the south of Qazvin province.
They speak the Tati language, consisting of a group of northwestern Iranian dialects closely related to the Talysh language. Persian and Azeri are also spoken.
Tats of Iran are mainly Shia Muslims and about 300,000 population.

Baloch
Balochs are an Iranian people. The Balochis of Iran live in southern and central parts of Sistan and Baluchestan province, one of the most remote and isolated areas of Iran, especially from the majority of the people. The northern part of the province is called Sistan and 63% of the population are ethnic Baloch while the rest are Persian Sistani. The Baloch are Sunni Muslims, in contrast to the Sistani Persians who are adherents of Shia Islam. The capital of Sistan and Baluchestan is Zahedan and is inhabited by Baloch people, the next largest city of the province is Zabol in Sistan and is inhabited predominantly by Sistani Persians. The town of Jask in neighbouring Hormozgan Province is also inhabited by Baloch people. They form one of the smallest ethnicities in Iran.

Turkic peoples

The largest Turkic group in Iran are the Iranian Azerbaijanis, forming the second largest ethnicity in the nation after the majority Persian population.

Smaller Turkic groups account for about 2% of Iranian population between them, about half of this number is accounted for by the
Iranian Turkmen, the other half comprises various tribal confederacies such as the Qashqai or the Khorasani Turks. According to an estimation presented by the anthropologist Sekandar Amanolahi in peer-reviewed journal Iran and the Caucasus, the number of Iranian Turkophones "does not exceed 9 millions".

Azerbaijanis

Many sources assert that Iranian Azerbaijanis are a Turkic-speaking people of Iranian origin. Estimated numbers or percentages vary significantly and many estimates cited appear to be politically motivated. They are often considered the second largest ethnic group in Iran and the largest ethnic minority. The main estimations are stated below:
 15%
 15.5%
 16%
 24 percent

In the historic Azerbaijan region, the population consists mainly of Azerbaijanis. Azeris form the largest ethnic group in Iranian Azerbaijan, while Kurds are the second largest group and a majority in many cities of West Azerbaijan Province. Iranian Azerbaijan is one of the most densely populated regions of Iran. Many of these various linguistic, religious, and tribal minority groups, and Azeris themselves have settled widely outside the region. The majority of Azeris are followers of Shi'a Islam. Iranian Azerbaijanis mainly reside in the northwest provinces, including the Iranian Azerbaijan provinces (East Azerbaijan, West Azerbaijan, Ardabil, and Zanjan), as well as regions of the North to Hamadan County and Shara District in the East Hamadan Province, and some regions of Qazvin Province. Some Azerbaijani minorities also live in Markazi, Kordestan, Gilan and Kermanshah provinces. Azerbaijanis also make up significant minorities in various parts of central Iran, especially Tehran, Azerbaijanis have also emigrated and resettled in large numbers in Khorasan and Qom. Immigrant Azerbaijani communities have been represented by people prominent not only among urban and industrial working classes but also in commercial, administrative, political, religious, and intellectual circles.

Turkmen 

Iranian Turkmens are primarily concentrated in the provinces of Golestān and North Khorasan. The largest Turkmen city in Iran is Gonbad-e Kavoos, followed by Bandar Torkaman. Iranian Turkmens are mostly Sunni Muslims.

Turkic tribal groups

The Qashqai people mainly live in the provinces of Fars, Khuzestan and southern Isfahan, especially around the city of Shiraz in Fars. They speak the Qashqai language which is a member of the Turkic family of languages. The Qashqai were originally nomadic pastoralists and some remain so today.
The traditional nomadic Qashqai travelled with their flocks each year from the summer highland pastures north of Shiraz roughly 480 km or 300 mi south to the winter pastures on lower (and warmer) lands near the Persian Gulf, to the southwest of Shiraz. The majority, however, have now become partially or wholly sedentary. The trend towards settlement has been increasing markedly since the 1960s.

The Khorasani Turks are Turkic-speaking people inhabiting parts of north-eastern Iran, and in the neighbouring regions of Turkmenistan up to beyond the Amu Darya River. They speak the Khorasani Turkic and live in North Khorasan, Razavi Khorasan, and Golestan provinces alongside Turkmens.

Semitic

Arabs

2% of Iran's citizens are Arabs.  The historically large and oil-rich cities of Mahshahr, Behbahan, Masjed Soleyman, Izeh, Dezful, Shushtar, Andimeshk, Shush, Ramhormoz, Baghemalak, Gotvand, Lali, Omidieh, Aghajari, Hendijan, Ramshir, Haftkel, Bavi are inhabited by people who speak either Luri, Bakhtiari and Persian languages. There are smaller communities in Qom where there are a significant number of Arabs being of Lebanese descent, as well as Razavi Khorasan and Fars provinces. Iranian Arab communities are also found in Bahrain, Iraq, Lebanon, Kuwait, United Arab Emirates, and Qatar.

Assyrians

The Assyrian people of Iran are a Semitic people who speak modern Assyrian, a neo-Aramaic language descended from Classical Syriac, and are Eastern Rite Christians belonging mostly to the Assyrian Church of the East and, to a lesser extent, to the Chaldean Catholic Church, Syriac Orthodox Church and Ancient Church of the East. They claim descent from the ancient peoples of Mesopotamia. They share a common identity, rooted in shared linguistic and religious traditions, with Assyrians in Iraq and elsewhere in the Middle East such as Syria and Turkey, as well as with the Assyrian diaspora.

The Assyrian community in Iran numbered approximately 200,000 prior to the Islamic Revolution of 1979. However, after the revolution many Assyrians left the country, primarily for the United States, and the 1996 census counted only 32,000 Assyrians.  Current estimates of the Assyrian population in Iran range from 32,000 to 50,000. The Iranian capital, Tehran, is home to the majority of Iranian Assyrians; however, approximately 15,000 Assyrians reside in northern Iran, in Urmia and various Assyrian villages in the surrounding area.

Jews

Judaism is one of the oldest religions practiced in Iran and dates back to late biblical times. The biblical books of Isaiah, Daniel, Ezra, Nehemiah, Chronicles, and Esther contain references to the life and experiences of Jews in Iran.

By various estimates, 10,800 Jews remain in Iran, mostly in Tehran, Isfahan, and Shiraz. BBC reported Yazd is home to ten Jewish families, six of them related by marriage, however some estimate the number is much higher. Historically, Jews maintained a presence in many more Iranian cities. Iran contains the largest Jewish population of any Muslim majority country except Turkey.

A number of groups of Jews of Iran have split off since ancient times. They are now recognized as separate communities, such as the Bukharan Jews and Mountain Jews. In addition, there are several thousand in Iran who are, or who are the direct descendants of, Jews who have converted to Islam and the Bahá'í Faith.

Mandaeans

Iranian Mandaeans live mainly in the Khuzestan Province in southern Iran. Mandeans are a Mandaic-speaking ethno-religious group who follow their own distinctive Gnostic, monotheistic religion called Mandaeism, sometimes also known as Sabianism (after the mysterious Sabians mentioned in the Quran, a name historically claimed by several religious groups). They venerate John the Baptist (Yaḥyā ibn Zakarīyā) as their greatest prophet. They number some 10,000 people in Iran, though Alarabiya has put their number as high as 60,000 in 2011.

Caucasus-derived groups

Armenians

Armenian settlements in Iran dates back millennia. Ever since antiquity, Armenians and Iranians have always had significant interactions with each other. These interactions include cultural, linguistic, economic, and more.

Armenians used to inhabit a large portion of modern-day northern Iran, most significantly on the western shores of Lake Urmia.

Armenians and Iranians shared many cultural and religious characteristics. Before the 3rd century AD, no other country had as much influence over Armenia as Parthia. Intermarriage between the Parthian and Armenian nobility was very common, and for a large portion of Armenian history, much of Armenia was ruled by the modern-day Iranians.

In 1604, Shah Abbas I relocated 500,000 Armenians from his Armenian lands to an area in Isfahan called New Julfa. Most of the Armenians Shah Abbas I relocated were from Nakhichevan, Julfa, hence the name new Julfa.

The newly formed Armenian community in Isfahan played a considerable role in Iran's economic and cultural development. Shah Abbas I granted the Armenians monopoly over silk and gave them many other trade incentives. Thus, the Armenian community quickly became very wealthy. The Armenians were given these trade incentives due to the immense trade routes they covered around the globe. Additionally, Armenians were also known for their honesty regarding trade. Furthermore, the policies of Shah Abbas proved to be very successful for the Iranian economy, where after a brief period of time, the Iranian economy was booming.

After the success of the Armenian community in New Julfa, the Armenians of New Julfa migrated to other major countries. They formed other settlements connecting many of these newly formed Armenian settlements to Isfahan, Iran. These settlements were in the Philippines, India, Venice, France, Spain, the Netherlands, and Russia. Thus, all these led to creating a new age for Iran where Iranian goods traveled the world and were consumed by Europeans and Indians.

The current Iranian-Armenian population is somewhere around 500,000. They mostly live in Tehran and Jolfa district. After the Iranian Revolution, many Armenians immigrated to Armenian diasporic communities in North America and western Europe. Today the Armenians are Iran's largest Christian religious minority, followed by Assyrians.

Georgians

Iranian Georgians are Twelver Shia Muslims, whereas the vast majority of Georgians elsewhere in the world are Christian.

The Georgian language is the only Caucasian language fully functioning in Iran and it's spoken only by those that live in Fereydan and Fereydunshahr, and in smaller pockets all over Iran. Almost all other communities of Iranian Georgians in Iran have already lost their language, but retain a clear Georgian identity.

Once a very large minority in Iran mainly due to mass deportations by the various early modern age and modern age Iranian empires (Safavids, Afsharids, and Qajars), of their Georgian subjects, nowadays, due to intermarrying and assimilating the number of Georgians in Iran is estimated to be over 100,000.

The Georgian language is still used by many of the Georgians in Iran. The centre of Georgians in Iran is Fereydunshahr, a small city 150 km to the west of Isfahan. The western part of Isfahan province is historically called Fereydan. In this area there are 10 Georgian towns and villages around Fereydunshahr. In this region the old Georgian identity is retained the best compared to other places in Iran. In many major Iranian cities, such as Tehran, Isfahan, Karaj and Shiraz, and Rasht live Georgians too.

In many other places such as Najafabad, Rahmatabad, Yazdanshahr and Amir Abad (near Isfahan) there are also Georgian pockets and villages. In Mazandaran Province in northern Iran, there are ethnic Georgians too. They live in the town of Behshahr, and also in Behshahr county, in Farah Abad, and many other places, which are usually called "Gorji Mahalle" (Georgian Neighbourhood). Most of these Georgians no longer speak the Georgian language, but retain aspects of Georgian culture and a Georgian identity. Some argue that Iranian Georgians retain remnants of Christian traditions, but there is no evidence for this.

Circassians

Like with the Georgians, once a very large minority in Iran all the way from the Safavid to the Qajar era, the vast majority of the Circassians have been assimilated into the population nowadays. However, significant numbers remain present, and they are the second-largest Caucasian ethnic group in the nation after the Georgians.

From Sir John Chardin's "Travels in Persia, 1673–1677":

There is scarce a Gentleman in Persia, whose Mother is not a Georgian, or a Circassian Woman; to begin with the King, who commonly is a Georgian, or a Circassian by the Mother's side.

Circassians alongside the Georgians were imported en masse by the Shahs to fulfil roles in the civil administration, the military, and the royal Harem, but also as craftsmen, farmers, amongst other professions.
Circassian women were both in Ottoman Turkey and Persia desired for their beauty, while the men were known as fearsome warriors.
Notable Iranians of Circassian descent of the past include Teresia Sampsonia, Shah Abbas II, Shah Suleiman I, Pari Khan Khanum (daughter of Shah Tahmasp, involved in many court intrigues), Shamkhal Sultan, Jamshid Beg (the assassinator of Shah Ismail II), and Anna Khanum.
Traces of Circassian settlements have lasted into the 20th century, and small pockets still exist scattered over the country, even after centuries of absorbing and assimilating, such as in Fars, Rasht, Aspas, Gilan, Mazandaran, and the capital Tehran (due to contemporary internal migration). Their total number nowadays is unknown due to heavy assimilation and lack of censuses based on ethnicity, but are known to be significant. Due to the same assimilation however, no sizeable number speaks the Circassian language anymore.

Recent immigration

Most of the large Circassian migrational waves towards mainland Iran stem from the Safavid and Qajar era, however a certain amount also stem from the relatively recent arrivals that migrated as the Circassians were displaced from the Caucasus in the 19th century. A Black African population exists due to historical slavery.
A substantial number of Russians arrived in the early 20th century as refugees from the Russian Revolution, but their number has dwindled following the Iran crisis of 1946 and the Iranian Revolution.
In the 20th to 21st centuries, there has been limited immigration to Iran from Turkey, Iraqis (especially huge numbers during the 1970s known as Moaveds), Afghanistan (mostly arriving as refugees in 1978), Lebanese (especially in Qom, though a Lebanese community has been present in the nation for centuries),
Indians (mostly arriving temporarily during the 1950s to 1970s, typically working as doctors, engineers, and teachers), Koreans (mostly in the 1970s as labour migrants), China (mostly since the 2000s working in engineering or business projects), and Pakistan, partly due to labour migrants and partly to Balochi ties across the Iranian-Pakistani border.
About 200,000 Iraqis arrived as refugees in 2003, mostly living in refugee camps near the border; an unknown number of these has since returned to Iraq.

Over the same period, there has also been substantial emigration from Iran, especially since the Iranian revolution (see Iranian diaspora, Human capital flight from Iran, Jewish exodus from Iran), especially
to the United States, Canada, Germany, Israel, and Sweden.

See also
 Ethnic minorities in Iran
 Peoples of the Caucasus in Iran
 Demographics of Iran

Notes

References

Works cited